The Knowlesville Lift Bridge is a Warren truss vertical-lift bridge on the New York State Canal System.

Structure and location 
The Knowlesville Lift Bridge is located on Knowlesville Road, Ridgeway, New York, and is a part of the New York State Canal System (Formally known as the New York State Barge Canal). The Vertical-lift bridge is a Warren Truss with a length of  sitting on concrete abutments, and has an open grate deck. The east side of the bridge has a truss erected in 1964 used to carry a gas pipeline across the Erie Canal. It has a normal water surface elevation of 514 feet, and a normal overhead clearance of 16.57 feet. According to the department of transportation, 1,100 vehicles use the bridge daily.

History 
The contract for building the bridge was awarded to the Thomas Crimmins Contracting Company of New York, and machinery operating the bridge was installed in 1910. The bridge was rehabilitated, and a new control building was built 1975. During 1985, the bridge's electrical systems were rehabilitated In November 2017, the bridge was closed for steel repairs, and opened next year in June 2018

See also 

 Vertical-lift bridge
 List of Vertical-lift bridges
 Warren truss

References

Erie Canal
Warren truss bridges in the United States
Vertical lift bridges in New York (state)